Holmgate railway station was a small station on the Ashover Light Railway and it served the Holmgate area of Clay Cross, North East Derbyshire, England. The station had a siding capable of holding around six wagons. It was provided with a small wooden shelter and a telephone box. After closure in 1950. The site was demolished and is grazed to the ground.

References

Disused railway stations in Derbyshire
Railway stations closed in 1950
Railway stations opened in 1925
Former London, Midland and Scottish Railway stations